Michel Bock (born 1971) is a Canadian historian, who specializes in the history of Franco-Ontarian communities and cultures. His book Quand la nation débordait les frontières: les minorités françaises dans la pensée de Lionel Groulx was the winner of the 2005 Governor General's Award in the French language non-fiction category.

He graduated with a master's degree in history in 1996 from Laurentian University, and earned his PhD at the University of Ottawa, where he is now a professor of History.

Works

 Bâtir sur le roc: De l'ACFEO à l'ACFO du Grand Sudbury, 1910-1987 (Prise de parole, 1994)
 Comment un peuple oublie son nom: La crise identitaire franco-ontarienne et la presse française de Sudbury, 1960-1975 (Prise de parole, 2001)
 L'Ontario français: des Pays-d'en-haut à nos jours (CFORP, 2004)
 Quand la nation débordait les frontières: les minorités françaises dans la pensée de Lionel Groulx (2004)

References

1971 births
Living people
21st-century Canadian historians
Canadian male non-fiction writers
Writers from Greater Sudbury
Franco-Ontarian people
Laurentian University alumni
Canadian non-fiction writers in French
Governor General's Award-winning non-fiction writers

University of Ottawa alumni
Academic staff of the University of Ottawa